Zeinab Giveh (born 20 July 1983) is a volleyball player from Iran, who plays as outside hitter for the Iran women's National Team and Shumen W Club.

Giveh was born in Tehran. She is the current first captain of Women's National Team. In January 2017, she and Maedeh Borhani, her teammate and the second captain of Women's National Team joined the Bulgarian club, Shumen W to become the first Iranian female volleyball players who plays abroad.

References

1983 births
Iranian women's volleyball players
Living people